Gadong is a commercial area in Bandar Seri Begawan, the capital of Brunei. It is a popular shopping and dining area in the city as well as in Brunei, with several shops, restaurants and cafes establishing their presence in the area.

Commerce 
Commercial activity in Gadong focuses in the area of the commercial buildings owned by Abdul Razak Holdings, a local real estate company which also owns a few other commercial buildings in Bandar Seri Begawan as well as abroad. Two of the company's most well-known commercial buildings are The Mall, a popular shopping mall in Brunei, and The Centrepoint Hotel.

Gadong is also the location of Gadong Wet Market, one of the main marketplaces in the city selling fresh meat and produce. Adjacent to it is Pasar Pelbagai Barangan Gadong (also known as Gadong Night Market), the popular night market in town. Although it has existed for many years, it used to be a makeshift market, with tents erected on the parking spaces of the wet market. However, the night market has since been made permanent on the location with the completion of an open-air building. It was inaugurated in early 2017 and given the official Malay name .

References 

Bandar Seri Begawan